The Swatch FIVB World Tour 2010 is an international beach volleyball competition.

The tour consists of 12 tournaments with both genders and 5 separate gender tournaments.

Grand Slam
There are four Grand Slam tournaments. These events give a higher number of points and more money than the rest of the tournaments.
Rome, Italy- Foro Italico Beach Volley Grand Slam, 17–23 May 2010
Moscow, Russia– Grand Slam Moscow, June 7–14, 2010
Stavanger, Norway- ConocoPhillips Grand Slam, June 28 - July 4, 2010
Gstaad, Switzerland– 1 to 1 Energy Grand Slam, 5–11 July 2010
Klagenfurt, Austria– A1 presented by Volksbank, July 26 - August 1, 2010
Stare Jabłonki, Poland- Mazury Orlen Grand Slam, 2–8 August 2010

Tournament results

Women

Men

Medal table by country

References

External links
2010 Swatch FIVB World Tour - tour calendar at FIVB.org
Beachvolley at Swatch.com

 

2010 in beach volleyball
2010